Catherine Bowman (born in El Paso, Texas) is an American poet.

Her most recent poetry collection is Can I Finish, Please? (Four Way Books, 2016), and her poems have appeared in literary journals and magazines including The Best American Poetry, TriQuarterly, River Styx, Conjunctions, Kenyon Review, Ploughshares, The Los Angeles Times, Crazyhorse, The New Yorker, and The Paris Review, and in six editions of The Best American Poetry. Her honors include fellowships from Yaddo and the New York Foundation for the Arts. Bowman is a full professor in the Creative Writing Program at Indiana University, and also teaches at the Fine Arts Work Center in Provincetown. She lives in Bloomington, Indiana.

Honors
 1994 Kate Tufts Discovery Award
 Peregrine Smith Poetry Prize
 Dobie Paisano Fellowship from the University of Texas
 1990 New York Foundation for the Arts Fellowship in Poetry

Published works
Full-length poetry collections

 Can I Finish, Please? (Four Way Books, 2016)
 The Plath Cabinet (Four Way Books, 2009)
 
 
 

Anthologies edited

Further reading
Art at Our Doorstep: San Antonio Writers and Artists featuring Catherine Bowman. Edited by Nan Cuba and Riley Robinson (Trinity University Press, 2008).

References

External links

Ploughshares 
 Poems: 
 Poem: 
 Poem: 

Living people
People from El Paso, Texas
Indiana University faculty
Poets from Texas
Writers from Bloomington, Indiana
Year of birth missing (living people)
American women poets
Poets from Indiana
20th-century American poets
20th-century American women writers
21st-century American poets
21st-century American women writers
American women academics